Whipped is a 2000 American comedy film directed by Peter M. Cohen and starring Amanda Peet, Brian Van Holt, Jonathan Abrahams, Zorie Barber, and Judah Domke.

Premise
Three single men gather at a local restaurant every Sunday so they can discuss each other's sex lives; however, when each one of them falls in love with beautiful girl named Mia (Amanda Peet), their weekly ritual becomes something of a trial, and their once strong friendships are put at risk.

Cast
 Amanda Peet as Mia
 Brian Van Holt as Brad
 Beth Ostrosky as Beth
 Judah Domke as Eric
 Zorie Barber as Zeke
 Jonathan Abrahams as Jonathan
 Callie Thorne as Liz
 Bridget Moynahan as Marie

Reception
Whipped has an overall approval rating of 13% on Rotten Tomatoes, based on 68 reviews, with a weighted average of 3.4/10. The website's critics consensus reads: "The sex jokes in Whipped are tiresomely vulgar and unfunny. Critics also condemn the movie as cynical and mean-spirited, with no likeable characters."  Audiences polled by CinemaScore gave the film an average grade of "D+" on an A+ to F scale.

References

External links
 
 

2000 films
2000s English-language films
2000s sex comedy films
American independent films
American sex comedy films
2000 directorial debut films
2000 comedy films
2000s American films
2000 independent films